Dragomilo is a small settlement in the Municipality of Šmarje pri Jelšah in eastern Slovenia. It lies in the small valley of Dragomilo Creek in the hills south of Šmarje. The area is part of the traditional region of Styria and is now included in the Savinja Statistical Region.

References

External links
Dragomilo at Geopedia

Populated places in the Municipality of Šmarje pri Jelšah